A velocity receiver (velocity sensor) is a sensor that responds to velocity rather than absolute position. For example, dynamic microphones are velocity receivers. Likewise, many electronic keyboards used for music are velocity sensitive, and may be said to possess a velocity receiver in each key.  Most of these function by measuring the time difference between switch closures at two different positions along the travel of each key.

There are two types of velocity receivers, moving coil and piezoelectric. The former contains a coil supported by springs and a permanently fixed magnet and require no output signal amplifiers. Movement causes the coil to move relative to the magnet, which in turn generates a voltage that is proportional to the velocity of that movement.

Piezoelectric sensor velocity receivers are similar to a piezoelectric accelerometer, except that the output of the device is proportional to the velocity of the transducer. Unlike the moving coil variety, piezoelectric sensors will likely require an amplifier due to the small generated signal. 

Transducers